Mesembrina decipiens is a species of house flies, etc. in the family Muscidae.

References

Further reading

External links

 
 

Muscidae
Insects described in 1873